François Picard-Destelan (20 April 1909 in British Hong Kong – 12 January 1983 in Criquetot-l'Esneval) was a French admiral of the French Navy.

Biography 
He joined the French Navy in 1928, in Cherbourg. Promoted to Lieutenant de vaisseau in 1937, he served as an interpreter in 1942, during World War II. He served as Corvette captain in 1945 on the Richelieu-class battleship and Frigate captain in 1948. He was promoted to capitaine de vaisseau in 1954, Rear admiral in 1959 and Vice admiral from 1960 and 1967. He commanded the fleet of the Pacific.

Awards 
 Chevalier de la Légion d'Honneur
 Officier de la Légion d'Honneur
 Commandeur de la Légion d'honneur
 Croix de Guerre

External links 
 http://ecole.nav.traditions.free.fr/officiers_picard_francois.htm

Notes

French Navy admirals
1909 births
1983 deaths
French military personnel of World War II
Chevaliers of the Légion d'honneur
Recipients of the Croix de Guerre 1939–1945 (France)
French expatriates in Hong Kong